Bare metal is computer hardware that runs without an operating system.

Bare metal may also refer to:

 BareMetal, an exokernel-based computer operating system

See also
 Bare metal arc welding
 Bare-metal stent, in medicine
 Bare-metal restore, in data recovery
 Bare-metal server